Sponsor is a 2019 Burmese drama film, directed by Aung Zaw Lin starring Nay Toe, Paing Phyo Thu, Zin Wine, Myat Kay Thi Aung and Ye Lay. The film, produced by  New Phoe Wa Film Production premiered in Myanmar on October 3, 2019.

Cast
Nay Toe as Toe Wai
Paing Phyo Thu as Soe Soe Wai
Zin Wine as U Than Win Naing
Myat Kay Thi Aung as Mya Sandy Oo
Ye Lay as Moe Wai
Kyaw Kyaw as Min Khant Kyaw
Chaw Kalyar as Honey Zin
Khine Thazin Oo as Wai Wai

References

2019 films
2010s Burmese-language films
Burmese drama films
Films shot in Myanmar
2019 drama films